The Toronto Police Association (TPA), founded in 1944, is a labour organization representing the approximately 5,500 uniformed and 2,500 civilian members of the Toronto Police Service in Toronto, Ontario, Canada.  While police officers in Ontario are prohibited by law from forming a union, the TPA fulfills most of the functions of a public-sector union, including collective bargaining contract negotiations with its membership's employer, the Toronto Police Service.

See also

 Law enforcement in Canada
 Police union

External links
 

Police unions
Law enforcement in Canada
Toronto Police Service